FC Komunalnyk Luhansk was a professional football team based in Luhansk, Ukraine. Komunalnyk Luhansk played in the Ukrainian Second League. It gained professional status in 2007. It played games on Enerhetyk Stadium in Severodonetsk. After winning the Druha Liha B Championship, Komunalnyk Luhansk were promoted to the Persha Liha for the 2008/09 season.

After competing in thirteen rounds of the competition Komunalnyk Luhansk withdrew from the PFL on October 17, 2008 and lost their professional status.

Honors

Ukrainian Druha Liha: 1
 Champions 2007/08 Group B

League and cup history

{|class="wikitable"
|-bgcolor="#efefef"
! Season
! Div.
! Pos.
! Pl.
! W
! D
! L
! GS
! GA
! P
!Domestic Cup
!colspan=2|Europe
!Notes
|-
|align=center|2007–08
|align=center|3rd "B"
|align=center bgcolor=gold|1
|align=center|34
|align=center|22
|align=center|7
|align=center|5
|align=center|56
|align=center|26
|align=center|73
|align=center|1/64 finals
|align=center|
|align=center|
|align=center bgcolor=green|Promoted
|-
|align=center|2008–09
|align=center|2nd
|align=center|–
|align=center|13
|align=center|2
|align=center|1
|align=center|10
|align=center|12
|align=center|31
|align=center|7
|align=center|1/16 finals
|align=center|
|align=center|
|align=center bgcolor=red|Withdrew
|}

See also
 FC Yalos Yalta, a single season team

External links
 Official website Russian, This link no longer exists

References

 
Football clubs in Luhansk
Defunct football clubs in Ukraine
Association football clubs established in 2007
Association football clubs disestablished in 2008
2007 establishments in Ukraine
2008 disestablishments in Ukraine